Naqab Zan is a 2019 Pakistani thriller drama television series produced by Momina Duraid under MD Productions. It has Ali Abbas, Saboor Aly and Hajra Yamin in pivotal roles.

Cast
 Ali Abbas as Aamir; Jameel and Nafissa's son in law, Dua and Farhat's husband, Faria's brother-in-law (male antagonist) 
 Saboor Aly as Dua; Jameel and Nafisa's daughter, Farhat and Faria's sister, Aamir's second ex-wife (female protagonist)
 Ali Ansari as Meerab; Dua's love interest, Ramsha’s brother and Jahan Ara’s son (male protagonist)
 Hajra Yamin as Farhat; Jameel and Nafisa's daughter, Dua and Faria's older sister, Aamir's first wife.
 Waseem Abbas as Jameel; Farhat Dua and Faria's father, Nafisa's husband, Aamir's father in law
 Amna Malik as Ramsha: Meerab's sister, daughter of Jahan Ara. Dua's therapist.  
 Haris Waheed as Raheel; A servant in the house
 Ghazala Butt as Dua's aunt
 Tabbasum Arif as Tai Jan
 Farah Nadir as Raheel's mother
 Ayesha Khan as Dua's grandmother
 Sehar Khan as Faria; Dua's younger sister
 Rashida Tabassum
 Ali Tariq
 Qamar Ul Islam

References

External links

Pakistani drama television series
2019 Pakistani television series debuts